Manakambahiny Est is a municipality in Madagascar. It belongs to the district of Ambatondrazaka, which is a part of Alaotra-Mangoro Region. The population of the commune was estimated to be approximately 8,000 in 2001 commune census.

Primary and junior level secondary education are available in town. The majority 80% of the population of the commune are farmers, while an additional 18% receives their livelihood from raising livestock. The most important crop is rice, while other important products are bananas, sugarcane, cassava and sweet potatoes.  Services provide employment for 2% of the population.

National Parks
The entrance of the Zahamena National Park is situated at 4 km from Manakambahiny Est.

References 

Populated places in Alaotra-Mangoro